Norman Earl Smith (May 27, 1917 – August 5, 2012) was an American coach of many sports at Campbell University and also a basketball and baseball coach at East Carolina University. Born in Micro, North Carolina, Smith attended East Carolina and participated in baseball, basketball, and football from his sophomore year through his senior year. He resided in Fayetteville, North Carolina until his death on August 5, 2012.

He graduated in 1939 and later became a football, basketball, baseball, tennis and cross country coach at Campbell University. Under Smith's guidance, Campbell won three straight North Carolina Junior College football championships (1946–48). He also led the 1948–49 and 1951–52 basketball teams an overall record of 29–20 including the junior college national tournament in Hutchinson, Kansas.

In 1959 Smith returned to ECU to become head coach of the Pirates basketball team. He led the team to a record of 53–40 in his four years of coaching. In 1963, after finishing his basketball coaching career, Smith turned to the ECU baseball team. He led them to a very impressive record of 185–103–2 in nine years. Of those 186 victories, the team finished first place in the Southern Conference in four consecutive years (1966–70). Smith has baseball's third highest winning percentage at .642.

He was inducted into the Pirate Hall of Fame in 1977, and the Campbell University Athletics Hall of Fame in April 1986. He later became a professional baseball scout for the San Diego Padres.

He died at Cape Fear Valley Medical Center in 2012.

References

1917 births
2012 deaths
Baseball coaches from North Carolina
Basketball coaches from North Carolina
American men's basketball players
Basketball players from North Carolina
Campbell Fighting Camels football coaches
Campbell Fighting Camels basketball coaches
East Carolina Pirates baseball coaches
East Carolina Pirates baseball players
East Carolina Pirates football players
East Carolina Pirates men's basketball coaches
East Carolina Pirates men's basketball players
San Diego Padres scouts
Campbell Fighting Camels and Lady Camels cross country coaches
College tennis coaches in the United States
Sportspeople from Fayetteville, North Carolina
People from Johnston County, North Carolina
American men's basketball coaches